Katie Combaluzier (born January 18, 1994) is a Canadian para alpine skier who competed at the 2022 Winter Paralympics.

Career
Combaluzier made her debut at the 2021 World Para Snow Sports Championships where she won the silver medal in the super combined and giant slalom events. She also finished third in the downhill event. Combaluzier qualified to compete at the 2022 Winter Paralympics.

References

External links
 

1994 births
Living people
Skiers from Toronto
Canadian female alpine skiers
Alpine skiers at the 2022 Winter Paralympics
21st-century Canadian women
Paralympic alpine skiers of Canada